Serve-and-volley is a style of play in tennis where the player serving moves quickly towards the net after hitting a serve, to attempt to hit a volley afterwards. In the serve-and-volley playstyle, the server attempts to hit a volley (a shot where the ball is struck without allowing it to bounce), as opposed to the baseline game, where the server stays back following the serve and attempts to hit a groundstroke (a shot where the ball is allowed to bounce before contact is made). The serve-and-volley style of play has diminished in recent years with advances in racquet and string technologies which allow players to generate a great amount of top spin on groundstrokes and passing shots. The slowing of court surfaces and deflation of balls, promoting longer rallies for the enjoyment of spectators, has also devalued the serve-and-volley style.

The aim of this strategy is to put immediate pressure on the opponent with the intent of ending points quickly. Good returns must be made, or else the server can gain the advantage. This tactic is especially useful on fast courts (e.g. grass courts) and less so on slow courts (e.g. clay courts). For it to be successful, the player must either have a good serve to expose an opponent's poor return or be exceptionally quick and confident in movement around the net to produce an effective returning volley. Ken Rosewall, for instance, had a feeble serve but was a very successful serve-and-volley player for two decades. Goran Ivanišević, on the other hand, had success employing the serve-and-volley strategy with great serves and average volleys.

The serve-and-volley era (roughly 1940-2000) 
Although some early tennis greats such as Bill Tilden, Ellsworth Vines, and Don Budge were noted for their fine serves and net games, they did not play a 100% serve-and-volley style game. Jack Kramer in the late 1940s was the first world-class player to consistently come to the net after every serve, including his second serve. Kramer writes, however, in his 1979 autobiography, that it was Bobby Riggs, his opponent in the 1948 Pro tennis tour who began the strategy: "When we first started touring he came at me on his first serve, on his second serve, and on my second serve.... my second serve didn't kick like Bobby's, so he could return that deep enough and follow into the net.... It forced me to think attack constantly. I would rush in and try to pound his weakest point -- his backhand. So the style I am famous for was not consciously planned: it was created out of the necessity of dealing with Bobby Riggs."

In the mid-1950s, when Pancho Gonzales was dominating professional tennis with his serve-and-volley game, occasional brief attempts were made to partially negate the power of his serve. This, it was felt, would lead to longer rallies and more spectator interest. At least three times the rules were modified:

 In several important tournaments such as the United States Professional Championships the Van Alen Streamlined Scoring System (VASSS), devised by James Van Alen, was used. The match was scored as if in table tennis, with 21 points per game, 5 serves per player, and no second serves. The fans preferred the traditional scoring system, however, and in any case Gonzales continued to win under VASSS rules.
 Jack Kramer, by then the professional tour promoter and no longer its dominant player, also tried a three-bounce rule, in which the server could not come to the net until the ball had been in play for at least three bounces. Gonzales won anyway, and this experiment was dropped.
 Kramer also tried marking a secondary service line one yard behind the baseline, so that the server was further away from the net when he served. Once again Gonzales was undeterred and the original rules were restored.

Other male tennis players known for their serve-and-volley technique include Pancho Segura, Frank Sedgman, Ken Rosewall, Lew Hoad, Rod Laver, Roy Emerson, John McEnroe, Stefan Edberg, Pat Cash, Boris Becker, Patrick Rafter, Pete Sampras and Tim Henman. Sampras, despite being known for his great serve and volley game, did not always come to the net behind the serve on slower courts, particularly on the second serve. This was especially the case when he was younger. Edberg is considered by many experts as the leading proponent of the serve-and-volley game in the modern era. 

The serve-and-volley strategy has traditionally been less common amongst female players. An early pioneer in women's volleying was Elizabeth Ryan, who was at the top of the women's game in the mid-to-late 1920s. But it was later on that serve and volley caught on in women's game. The style propelled Margaret Court to become the all-time leader in Grand Slam titles (24 in singles, 62 total). Martina Navratilova and Jana Novotná later became players well known for their serve-and-volley style. More recently, players such as Martina Hingis, Justine Henin, and Amélie Mauresmo were willing to come to the net, with Henin and Mauresmo playing a very heavy serve and volley style and volleying in general match during the 2006 Wimbledon Finals. Later in her career Henin was also known for serving and volleying on set and match points, such as on Championship point at the 2007 US Open Final against Svetlana Kuznetsova.

Serve-and-volley in the twenty-first century
Although the strategy has become less common in both the men's and women's game, a few players still prefer to approach the net on their serves in the twenty-first century. Examples of active male players who employ serve-and-volley as the chief style of play include: Feliciano López, Nicolas Mahut, Rajeev Ram, Ivo Karlović, Dustin Brown, Pierre-Hugues Herbert, Maxime Cressy, Łukasz Kubot, and Mischa Zverev. 

On the women's side, serve-and-volley has become almost extinct at the very top level. Taylor Townsend and Hsieh Su-wei are the only active notable (WTA elite) players that prefers to play with this style.

Other players, despite not being pure serve-and-volleyers, do employ serve-and-volley as a surprise tactic. Examples include John Isner, Rafael Nadal, and Daniil Medvedev.

The removal of grass surfaces from major tournaments and the change in 2001 of Wimbledon's grass to encourage higher bounces have reduced the efficacy of this playing style.

Views on serve-and-volley
Bill Tilden, the dominant player of the 1920s and one of the fathers of the cannonball serve, nevertheless preferred to play from the backcourt and liked nothing better than to face an opponent who threw powerful serves and groundstrokes at him and who rushed the net — one way or another Tilden would find a way to hit the ball past him. Tilden spent a great amount of time analyzing the game of tennis. His book Match Play and the Spin of the Ball (1925) is still in print. In it, Tilden states that a perfect baseline player will always beat a perfect serve-and-volleyer 6–0 because his returns of service will be winning passing shots; however he also states that of course neither such a player can exist. Tilden used this style of play for many years.

Some of the most interesting matches of all time according to Pat Cash have pitted great baseliners such as Björn Borg, Mats Wilander or Andre Agassi against great serve-and-volleyers such as John McEnroe, Pat Rafter or Pete Sampras. Since Tilden's time, head-to-head results on various surfaces, such as those played out in the famous rivalry between Borg and McEnroe, contradict his theory that great baseline players will tend to defeat great serve-and-volley ones.

Another perspective on the serve-and-volley game is that it is less tiring than playing constantly from the backcourt. Kramer says in his autobiography that he and Pancho Segura once tried playing three matches in which they allowed the ball to bounce three times before either could approach the net. "I don't believe I could have played tennis the way Segoo and I did for the three nights because it wore me out, running down all those groundstrokes. It was much more gruelling than putting a lot into a serve and following it in." He went to say that "Rosewall was a backcourt player when he came into the pros, but he learned very quickly how to play the net. Eventually, for that matter, he became a master of it, as much out of physical preservation as for any other reason. I guarantee you that Kenny wouldn't have lasted into his forties as a world-class player if he hadn't learned to serve and volley."

Despite the improvements in racquet technology made towards the end of the twentieth century which made serve-and-volley a rarer tool in a tennis player's skill set, players familiar with the strategy still advocate it. Roger Federer advocated up-and-coming players not to ignore the tactic's strategy of coming to the net, especially on faster surfaces and as a surprise tactic. Yet other players, such as Mischa Zverev, acknowledged the difficulty of mastering serve-and-volley, recalling his 36-month effort to adopt the style. He said: "Every point, you have to be ready. You're either going to get passed, you're going to miss an easy volley or you're going to win the point," and likened it to the stochastic nature of flipping a coin.

References

Tennis terminology
Tennis strategy